Posen was the southern of two Prussian administrative regions, or Regierungsbezirke, of the Grand Duchy of Posen (1815–49) and its successor, the Province of Posen (1849–1918). The administrative region was bordered on the north by Regierungsbezirk Bromberg, to the west by the Province of Brandenburg, to the south by the Silesia Province, and to the east by Russian Congress Poland.

The Posen region was inhabited mainly by Roman Catholic Poles, although it had a minority of mostly Protestant Germans. After World War I, most of the territory of this region was ceded to Poland.

Divisions
Note: Prussian provinces were subdivided into units called Kreise (singular Kreis, abbreviated Kr., English "circle"), which were similar to large counties in US terms. Cities would have their own Stadtkreis (English: "urban district") and the surrounding rural area would be named for the city, but referred to as a Landkreis (English: "rural district"). In the case of Posen, the Landkreis was split into two: Landkreis Posen West, and Landkreis Posen East.  The region was originally divided into 16 larger Kreise, which were later divided into the final 27 Kreise, the larger ones spinning off smaller units.

Demographics 
The administrative region of Posen had a majority Polish population, with a significant German minority who were mostly concentrated in the western districts.

References

States and territories disestablished in 1918
Grand Duchy of Posen
History of Poznań
Government regions of Prussia
States and territories established in 1815
1815 establishments in Prussia
Former administrative regions of Greater Poland
Province of Posen